Love and Peace: A Tribute to Horace Silver is a 1995 studio album by Dee Dee Bridgewater, recorded in tribute to Horace Silver.

Background
The album features contributions by Silver himself, as well as by late Jimmy Smith. Silver makes two guest appearances on this album, on "Nica's Dream" and "Song for My Father". Silver's contributions were recorded on December 1, 1994. Bridgewater's performance earned her a Grammy nomination for Best Jazz Vocal Album.

Reception
Scott Yanow of AllMusic wrote, "Bridgewater uplifts Silver's lyrics, proves to be in prime form, and swings up a storm."

Track listing 
 "Permit Me to Introduce You to Yourself" – 3:25
 "Nica's Dream" – 5:14
 "The Tokyo Blues" – 5:44
 "Pretty Eyes" – 5:05
 "St. Vitus Dance" – 2:40
 "You Happened My Way" – 6:29
 "Soulville" – 4:16
 "Filthy McNasty" – 4:51
 "Song for My Father" – 5:30
 "Doodlin'" – 6:06
 "Lonely Woman" – 5:21
 "The Jody Grind" – 5:00
 "Blowin' the Blues Away" – 3:55

All music and lyrics written by Horace Silver.

Personnel
Dee Dee Bridgewater - vocals
Stéphane Belmondo - trumpet
Lionel Belmondo - tenor saxophone, arrangement of "Permit Me ..."
Thierry Eliez - piano  (except "Nica's Dream" and "Song for My Father")
Horace Silver - piano (on "Nica's Dream" and "Song for My Father")
Jimmy Smith - Hammond B3 organ (on "Filthy McNasty" and "The Jody Grind")
Hein van de Geyn - bass, arrangements
André Ceccarelli - drums

Chart positions

Notes

Dee Dee Bridgewater albums
Tribute albums
Verve Records albums
1995 albums